E. coli outbreak may refer to:
 2018 E. coli outbreak in the United States
 2014-2015 E. coli outbreak in Dorset
 2012 organic greens E coli outbreak in the United States
 2011 E. coli outbreak centered in Northern Germany
 2009 E. coli outbreak in the United Kingdom
 2006 E. coli outbreak in North America
 2005 E. coli outbreak in South Wales
 2000 E. coli outbreak in Walkerton, Ontario, Canada
 1996 E. coli outbreak of Odwalla Inc.